The Prairie Island Nuclear Generating Plant is an electricity-generating facility located in Red Wing, Minnesota, along the Mississippi River, and adjacent to the Prairie Island Indian Community reservation.

The nuclear power plant, which began operating in 1973, has two nuclear reactors (pressurized water reactors) manufactured by Westinghouse that produce a total 1,076 megawatts of power. Units 1 and 2 are licensed by the Nuclear Regulatory Commission (NRC) to operate through 2033 and 2034, respectively. The plant is owned by Northern States Power Company (NSP), a subsidiary of Xcel Energy, and is operated by Xcel Energy.

Prairie Island is one of two nuclear power plants in Minnesota (the other being Monticello Nuclear Generating Plant in Monticello). Prairie Island has attracted controversy in the early 21st century for its operator Xcel Energy's decision to store nuclear waste in large steel casks on-site. As this area is a floodplain of the Mississippi, many opponents of the decision fear the risk of water contamination through breach of the casks during seasonal flooding of this important river. They opposed renewal of the federal license at the Prairie Island facility.

In April 2008, Xcel requested that the U.S. Nuclear Regulatory Commission (NRC) renew the licenses of both reactors, extending them for an additional twenty years. The license renewals were approved in June 2011.

The company has also requested NRC approval to use a similar storage system at its Monticello plant, which is currently licensed through 2030.

In May 2006 repair workers at the plant were exposed to very low levels of radiation due to inhalation of radioactive iodine-131 (131I) gas. The gas leaked from the steam generators, which were opened for inspection.  131I gas is normally removed by means of a carbon-based filter; in this case the filter had developed a small leak. The NRC deemed this event to be of very low safety significance. It said that no overdose of radiation resulted in any of the workers.

The winter net electrical generation is 560 MW (Unit 1) and 554 MW (Unit 2). The gross electrical generation for both units is 592 MW.

Electricity Production

Surrounding population

The 2010 U.S. population within  of Prairie Island was 27,996, an increase of 4.6 percent in a decade, according to an analysis of U.S. Census data for MSNBC. The 2010 U.S. population within  was 2,945,237, an increase of 7.8 percent since 2000. Cities within 50 miles include Minneapolis (39 miles to city center) and St. Paul (32 miles to city center).

Spent fuel storage 
NSP had initially intended to send radioactive waste from this plant to a storage facility operated by the United States federal government, but no such site is yet open for use. (The Yucca Mountain nuclear waste repository is under construction, but given strong opposition in the region, the Obama Administration no longer thought this was an option.)

In 1991, Xcel Energy had requested permission from the Minnesota Public Utilities Commission to eventually store waste in 48 dry casks on the Prairie Island site. Opposition by environmentalists and the neighboring Prairie Island tribe led the Minnesota Legislature to decrease the number of allowed casks to 17; this was sufficient to keep the plant operating through approximately 2003.

When those casks filled, Xcel Energy requested that the limit be expanded beyond 17 casks.  The legislature granted the request, but required the company to make greater use of renewable energy in generating power, such as wind power. In addition, it was required to pay the adjacent Prairie Island Indian Community up to $2.25 million per year to help with evacuation improvements, and the acquisition and development of new land for their reservation. In addition, this money was to help pay for a health study and emergency management activities by the small tribe.

Steam generator replacement

Operators at Prairie Island Nuclear Generating Plant began a refueling outage on Unit 2 at 12:01 a.m. 9/23/2013. In addition to refueling the reactor, an expanded workforce replaced the unit's two steam generators. Unit 2 was expected to come back online within eight weeks; however, it did not resume operation until January 13, 2014. At 2 AM on January 14, Unit 2 reached 100% power output.

Seismic risk

The Nuclear Regulatory Commission's estimate of the risk each year of an earthquake intense enough to cause core damage to the reactor at Prairie Island was 1 in 333,333, according to an NRC study published in August 2010.

Emergency shutdowns

Xcel Energy performed an emergency shutdown in late January 2015 of the Unit 1 reactor after a cloud of steam built up in the pressurized cooling system following a cooling-down process to replace a seal in one of the reactor cooling pumps. The plant returned to full power in February 2015.

Unit 2 of the plant has been shut down due to an emergency on 5 March 2015, indicated by a fire alarm at 4:00 am CST. Xcel energy plant operators declared a “notification of an unusual event,” the lowest of four emergency classifications established by the U.S. Nuclear Regulatory Commission.

Unit 2 shut down automatically December 17, 2015, due to a turbine problem, and the fire alarm went off at the time.  Operators declared a "notification of unusual event".

See also

Monticello Nuclear Power Plant
Elk River Station (decommissioned)

References

External links

Prairie Island Coalition – a group opposing the storage of reactor waste
Nuclear Tourist: Prairie Island Nuclear Power Plant
Minnesota Legislative Reference Library: Prairie Island Nuclear Waste Storage

Energy infrastructure completed in 1973
Energy infrastructure completed in 1974
Buildings and structures in Goodhue County, Minnesota
Nuclear power plants in Minnesota
Nuclear power stations using pressurized water reactors
Xcel Energy
Red Wing, Minnesota